Open Season is a 1974 thriller film directed by Peter Collinson. It stars Peter Fonda, John Phillip Law, William Holden and Cornelia Sharpe. The film was shot in both Spain and England, with parts of those countries used to portray the American backwoods. The screenplay was by David Osborn and Liz Charles Williams, based on Osborn's novel.

Plot
The film follows three Vietnam veterans who are stimulated by violence, and by the subjugation and debasement of those they victimize. Every year they go on vacation in the wilderness, where they engage in a spree of brutality and violence. They choose unsuspecting pairs of victims and hunt them down like wild animals.  This year, they decide to kidnap a middle-aged man and his young mistress. After enduring an intense period of sexual manipulation, beatings, and humiliation, the two victims are eventually given time to try and escape after which they will be tracked down and killed. Both make a break, separately, but are found and killed by their tormentors.  At the end, one by one, the killers themselves are eliminated by an unknown stalker. He is revealed to be the father of a girl who was raped by the group prior to their military service, and who subsequently committed suicide after giving birth.

Cast
Peter Fonda as Ken
Cornelia Sharpe as Nancy Stillman
John Phillip Law as Greg
Richard Lynch as Art
Alberto de Mendoza as Martin
William Holden as Hal Wolkowski
May Heatherly as Alicia Rennick

Production
Fonda later said "I had a good time on that one. That was my first chance to play a really evil guy. I liked working with Richard Lynch and John Phillip Law. We shot it just outside Madrid and in Detroit. "

Theme song 'Casting Shadows' composer and performer: John Howard

References

External links

1974 films
Spanish thriller films
English-language Spanish films
British chase films
Films based on American novels
Films based on thriller novels
Films directed by Peter Collinson
Films about hunters
Columbia Pictures films
Films set in the United States
British serial killer films
Films about death games
1970s English-language films
1970s British films